Centrosomal protein of 78 kDa, also known as Cep78, is a protein that in humans is encoded by the CEP78 gene.

Clinical

Mutations in this gene have been associated with cone-rod dystrophy with hearing loss.

References

External links

Further reading

Centrosome